Liberty Township is one of eighteen townships in Callaway County, Missouri, USA.  As of the 2010 census, its population was 840.

Geography
The township includes one cemetery, named Concord, plus the streams of Fourmile Branch and Leeper Branch which are tributaries of Auxvasse Creek to the south.

History
Prior to the December 25, 1875 creation of Jackson Township, Liberty Township was much larger, and included the city of Auxvasse and the settlement of McCredie.  This is significant for historical and genealogical research.

The map on the 2nd page of the atlas published in 1876 still shows the much larger Liberty Township boundaries, which had just been changed at the end of 1875. Whereas the map from 1930 shows a smaller Liberty Township, which appears to approximate today's boundaries.

References

External links
 US-Counties.com
 City-Data.com

Townships in Callaway County, Missouri
Jefferson City metropolitan area
Townships in Missouri